Benedikt Willert (born 2 June 2001) is a German former professional footballer who played as a goalkeeper.

Career
Willert made his professional debut for 1. FC Nürnberg in the 2. Bundesliga on 4 November 2019, starting in the away match against VfL Bochum which finished as a 3–1 loss.

References

External links
 
 
 
 

2001 births
Living people
People from Forchheim
Sportspeople from Upper Franconia
Footballers from Bavaria
German footballers
Association football goalkeepers
1. FC Nürnberg II players
1. FC Nürnberg players
2. Bundesliga players
Regionalliga players